The classic Macintosh startup sequence includes hardware tests which may trigger the startup chime, Happy Mac, Sad Mac, and Chimes of Death. On Macs running macOS Big Sur or later the startup sound is enabled by default, but can be disabled by the user within System Preferences (Big Sur or Monterey) or System Settings (Ventura).

Startup chime 
The Macintosh startup chime is played on power-up, before trying to boot an operating system. The sound indicates that diagnostic tests run immediately at startup have found no hardware or fundamental software problems. The specific sound differs depending on the ROM, which greatly varies depending on Macintosh model. The first sound version in the first three Macintosh models is a simple square-wave "beep", and all subsequent sounds are various chords.

Mark Lentczner created the software that plays the arpeggiated chord in the Macintosh II. Variations of this sound were deployed until Jim Reekes created the startup chime in the Quadra 700 through the Quadra 800. Reekes said, "The startup sound was done in my home studio on a Korg Wavestation EX. It's a C major chord, played with both hands stretched out as wide as possible (with 3rd at the top, if I recall)." He created the sound as he was annoyed with the tri-tone startup chimes because they were too associated with the death chimes and the computer crashes. He recalls that Apple did not give him permission to change the sound but that he secretly snuck the sound into the computers with the help of engineers who were in charge of the ROM chips. When Apple discovered this, he refused to change it, using various claims in order to keep the new sound intact. He is also the creator of the iconic (or "earconic", as he calls it) "bong" startup chime in most Macintoshes since the Quadra 840AV. A slightly lower-pitched version of this chime is in all PCI-based Power Macs until the iMac G3. The Macintosh LC, LC II, and Macintosh Classic II do not use the Reekes chime, instead using an F major chord that just produces a "ding" sound. The first generation of Power Macintosh computers also do not use the Reekes chime, instead using a chord strummed on a Yamaha 12-string acoustic guitar by jazz guitarist Stanley Jordan. Further, the Power Macintosh 5200–6300 computers (excluding the 5400 and 5500, which have the "bong" chime like the one in the PCI-based Power Macs) use a unique chime, which is also in the television commercials for the Power Macintosh and PowerBook series from 1995 until 1998, and the 20th Anniversary Macintosh uses another unique sound.

For models built prior to the introduction of the Power Macintosh in 1994, the failure of initial self-diagnostic tests results in a Sad Mac icon, an error code, and distinctive Chimes of Death sounds.

The chime for all Mac computers from 1998 to early 2016 is the same chime used first in the iMac G3. The chord is a F-sharp major chord, and was produced by pitch-shifting the 840AV's sound. Since 2012, the Mac startup chime is a registered trademark in the United States, and is featured in the 2008 Pixar film WALL-E when the titular robot character is fully recharged by solar panels as well as in the 2007 Brad Paisley song "Online".

Starting with the 2016 MacBook Pro, all new Macs were shipped without a startup chime, with the Macs silently booting when powered on. In 2020, the startup chime would be added to these models with the release of macOS Big Sur, which allows it to be enabled or disabled in System Preferences. On the macOS Big Sur 11.0.1 beta, it was discovered that the new lower pitched chime was brought to all older supported Macs. In a firmware update included in the macOS Catalina 2020-001 Security Update, and the macOS Mojave 2020-007 Security Update, the new startup chime in Big Sur is brought to all Big Sur-supported Macs including the unsupported 2013 iMac.

Happy Mac 

A Happy Mac is the normal bootup (startup) icon of an Apple Macintosh computer running older versions of the Mac operating system. It was designed by Susan Kare in the 1980s, drawing inspiration from the design of the Compact Macintosh series and from the Batman character Two-Face.  The icon remained unchanged until the introduction of New World ROM Macs, when it was updated to 8-bit color. The Happy Mac indicates that booting has successfully begun, whereas a Sad Mac (along with the "Chimes of Death" melody or one or more beeps) indicates a hardware problem.

When a Macintosh boots into the classic Mac OS (Mac OS 9 or lower), the system will play its startup chime, the screen will turn gray, and the Happy Mac icon will appear, followed by the Mac OS splash screen (or the small "Welcome to Macintosh" screen in System 7.5 and earlier), which underwent several stylistic changes. Mac OS versions 8.6 and later also includes the version number in this splash screen (for example, "Welcome to Mac OS 8.6").

On early Macs without an internal hard drive, the computer boots up to a point where it needs to load the operating system from a floppy disk. Until the user inserts the correct disk, the Mac displays a floppy icon with a blinking question mark. In later Macs, a folder icon with a question mark that repeatedly changes to the Finder icon is shown if a System Folder or boot loader file cannot be found on the startup disk.

With Mac OS X 10.1, a new Happy Mac was included. This is also the last version with a Happy Mac icon; in version 10.2, the Happy Mac symbol was replaced with the Apple logo. In OS X Lion 10.7, the Apple logo was slightly shrunk and a drop-in shadow was added. In OS X Yosemite 10.10, the white screen with a gray Apple logo was replaced with a black screen with a white Apple logo and the spinning wheel was replaced with a loading bar. However, this only applies to Macs from 2013 and later, including the 2012 Retina MacBook Pros, and requires a firmware update to be applied. All earlier Macs still use the old screen. The shadow on the Apple logo was removed in OS X El Capitan 10.11. In 2016 and later Macs (excluding the Early 2016 MacBook), the Apple logo appears immediately when the screen turns on.

The Face ID logo for the iPhone X was based on the Happy Mac.

Bomb screen 

With the introduction of Mac OS X, in addition to the blinking system folder icon, a prohibition icon was added to show an incorrect OS version is found. The bomb screen in the classic Mac OS was replaced with a kernel panic, which was originally colored white but was changed to black in version 10.3.

Sad Mac 

A Sad Mac is a symbol in older-generation Apple Macintosh computers (hardware using the Old World ROM and not Open Firmware, which are those predating onboard USB), starting with the original 128K Macintosh and ending with the last NuBus-based Power Macintosh models (including the first-generation 6100, 7100, 8100, as well as the PowerBook 5300 and 1400), to indicate a severe hardware or software problem that prevented startup from occurring successfully. The Sad Mac icon is displayed, along with a set of hexadecimal codes that indicate the type of problem at startup. Different codes are for different errors.  This is in place of the normal Happy Mac icon, which indicates that the startup-time hardware tests were successful. In 68k models made after the Macintosh II, the Chimes of Death are played.

Models prior to the Macintosh II crash silently and display the Sad Mac, without playing any tone. PowerPC Macs play a sound effect of a car crash, and computers equipped with the PowerPC upgrade card use the three note brass fanfare death chime (A, E-natural, and E-flat), followed by the sound of a drum, same as the Macintosh Performa 6200 and Macintosh Performa 6300.

A Sad Mac may be deliberately generated at startup by pressing the interrupt switch on Macintosh computers that had one installed, or by pressing Command and Power keys shortly after the startup chime. On some Macintoshes such as PowerBook 540c, if the user presses the command and power keys before the boot screen displays, it will play the "chimes of death". The chimes are a fraction of normal speed and there is no Sad Mac displayed.

Old World ROM Power Macintosh and PowerBook models based on the PCI architecture do not use a Sad Mac icon and will instead only play the error/car-crash sound on a hardware failure (such as missing or bad memory, unusable CPU, or similar).

Mac OS X 10.2 Jaguar and later instead use the Universal "no" symbol to denote a hardware or software error that renders the computer non-bootable.

Chimes of Death 
The Chimes of Death are the Macintosh equivalent of a beep code on IBM PC compatibles. On all Macintosh models predating the adoption of PCI and Open Firmware, the Chimes of Death are often accompanied by a Sad Mac icon in the middle of the screen.

Different Macintosh series have different death chimes. The Macintosh II is the first to use the death chimes, a loud and eerie upward major arpeggio, with different chimes on many models. The Macintosh Quadra, Centris, Performa (including the 6200 and 6300, which were also Power Macintosh models, only occurring after the screen lights up), LC, and the Macintosh Classic II play a generally softer and lower pitched version of the upward major arpeggio, followed by three or four notes, with slight variation depending on the model of the Macintosh. The PowerBook 5300, 190, and 1400 use the second half of the 8-note arpeggio as found on the Quadra and Centris models, or the entire death chime if the error occurs before the screen lights up. The Macintosh Quadra 660AV and Centris 660AV use a sound of a single pass of Roland D-50's "Digital Native Dance" sample loop, and the NuBus based Power Macintosh models (including 6100, 7100, and 8100) series use a car crash sound. The Power Macintosh and Performa 6200 and 6300 series, before the screen comes on for these models, along with the Power Macintosh upgrade card, use an eerily dramatic 3-note brass fanfare with a rhythm of drums and cymbals; the former plays the 8-note arpeggio instead when the screen is on. The pre-G3 PCI Power Macs, the beige G3 Power Macs, the G3 All-In-One, and the PowerBook 2400, 3400, and G3 all use a sound of glass shattering; these models do not display a Sad Mac icon. Since the introduction of the iMac in 1998, the Chimes of Death are no longer used in favor of a series of tones to indicate hardware errors.

See also 
 Booting
 Power-on self-test
Screens of Death
Floppy Disk

References

External links 
 The Original Macintosh: Boot Beep – Folklore.org

Booting
Sound trademarks
Macintosh firmware
Macintosh operating systems